The Synagogue in the Agora of Athens is an ancient synagogue located in the Ancient Agora of Athens.

During an excavation in the summer of 1977, a piece of Pentelic marble apparently once part of a curvilinear frieze over a doorway or niche was discovered a few meters from the northeast corner of the Metroon.  The marble fragment is incised with the images of a seven-branched Menorah and a Lulav, or palm branch.     The synagogue is thought to date from the period between 267 and 396 CE.

Biblical reference
The apostle Paul is said in the Book of Acts to have visited a synagogue in Athens.  The identity of that synagogue cannot be firmly established.

See also
History of the Jews in Greece
Oldest synagogues in the world

References

Ancient synagogues
Ancient Jewish Greek history
Synagogues in Athens
Ancient Agora of Athens